This is a list of what are intended to be the notable top hotels by country, five or four star hotels, notable skyscraper landmarks or historic hotels which are covered in multiple reliable publications. It should not be a directory of every hotel in every country:

Uganda

Ukraine

United Arab Emirates

Dubai

United Kingdom

United States

Uruguay

 Belmont House, Montevideo
 Casapueblo, Punta del Este
 Four Seasons Resort Carmelo, Uruguay, Carmelo
 Hotel Carrasco, Montevideo
 Radisson Montevideo Victoria Plaza Hotel, Montevideo

References

U